The Mōhakatino River is a  river in the northern Taranaki region of New Zealand's North Island. It flows generally west from its origins west of Ōhura, roughly paralleling the course of its northerly neighbour, the larger Mokau River.

See also
List of rivers of New Zealand

References

Waitomo District
Rivers of Waikato
Rivers of New Zealand